Dangerous Exile is a 1957 British historical drama film directed by Brian Desmond Hurst and starring Louis Jourdan, Belinda Lee, Anne Heywood and Richard O'Sullivan. It concerns the fate of Louis XVII, who died in 1795 as a boy, yet was popularly believed to have escaped from his French revolutionary captors.

Plot
In 1795, the Duke Philippe de Beauvais smuggles his own son into the prison cell where Louis XVII is kept. Thus Louis XVII can escape unnoticed to England. Unfortunately the aerostat, steered by Duke Philippe de Beauvais, lands accidentally on a remote island. There an American spinster, Virginia Traill, takes care of the strange child. She finds the dauphin profoundly traumatised and not interested in becoming a king. Meanwhile, Louis' uncle in Vienna has declared himself the new French king. In order to safeguard his claim on the throne, he sends assassins who shall murder the dauphin.

Being unaware of the exchange, he has Richard de Beauvais killed. But now the dauphin's torturers recognise that they have been deceived. Informed by a message of an English spy they send a ship to the island where the real dauphin hides. They attack the house of Virginia Traill and stop at nothing to detect the dauphin's hiding-place.

Cast
 Louis Jourdan as the Duke Philippe de Beauvais
 Belinda Lee as Virginia Traill
 Keith Michell as Colonel Saint-Gérard
 Richard O'Sullivan as Louis XVII/Richard de Beauvais
 Martita Hunt as Lady Lydia Fell
 Finlay Currie as Monsieur Patient
 Anne Heywood as Glynis
 Jean Mercure as the police chef
 Jacques Brunius as De Chassagne
 Jean Claudio as De Castres, the comrade of Philippe à Paris
 Terence Longdon : Colonel Sir Frederick Venner

Production
The film was based on the novel A King Reluctant by Vaughan Wilkins, which was published in 1952. The New York Times called it "a rousing, colourful tale and historically convincing."

In February 1956 Rank announced A King Reluctant would be their expensive historical picture for the year with location filming to be done in Italy, Spain and the West Indies. Sir John Davis of Rank said "We cannot copy Hollywood's spectacular epics but we can provide good stories well-made - that is the answer to television competition."

Pat Jackson said he was offered the film to direct but turned it down as "I thought it was absolutely terrible" and claims it turned out to be a "ghastly flop".

The female lead went to Belinda Lee.

The film was shot in Pinewood Studios and on location in Cornwall in April 1957. Lee was injured when her hair caught fire during a scene. Vyvyan Holland, son of Oscar Wilde, worked on the film as a historical adviser.

Reception
The Manchester Guardian called the film "monstrous twaddle" with "just one merit - its beautifully colored photography".

Variety called it "a historical, cloak and dagger meller with all the typical excitements, absurdities, confusions, flashbacks, swordplay and general trimmings which  invariably rear their cliche-ridden heads in such pictures. It won’t stand out in the memory of patrons as one of the best pix this year, but it will provide safe entertain¬ment at most British cinemas."
 
The New York Times called it "a beautifully mounted tale" which "rarely comes to life, except in the superb, effectively colored period settings... Under Brian Desmond Hurst's rather unimaginative direction, the action simply lacks sustained suspense, instead of crawling with it... The lavish, meticulous castle interiors, the sweeping, azure-tinted coastal landscapes, and the murkiness of the Paris dungeons — all these have been woven into a striking background tapestry by Jack Maxsted, the art director."

References

External links

Dangerous Exile at TCMDB
Dangerous Exile at Monsieur.louisjourdan.net
New York Times review of film
 Dangerous Exile at the website dedicated to Brian Desmond Hurst

1957 films
Films set in 1795
French Revolution films
British historical drama films
Films about princes
Films set in France
Films shot in Cornwall
Films shot at Pinewood Studios
1950s historical drama films
Films scored by Georges Auric
Cultural depictions of Louis XVI
Cultural depictions of Louis XVII
1957 drama films
Films with screenplays by Patrick Kirwan
Films based on British novels
1950s English-language films
Films directed by Brian Desmond Hurst
1950s British films